Tom-e Khvajeh Bahmani (also Romanized as Tom-e Khvājeh Bahmanī; also known as Tonb-e Khvājeh Bahman) is a village in Band-e Zarak Rural District, in the Central District of Minab County, Hormozgan Province, Iran. At the 2006 census, its population was 82, in 14 families.

References 

Populated places in Minab County